The Fango is a small coastal river in the department of Haute-Corse, Corsica, France.
The Fango Valley was designated a biosphere reserve in 1977.
It holds flora and fauna representative of all regions of Corsica from the coast to the highest mountains.

Course

It crosses the communes of Galéria and Manso.
It extends from Galéria to the Paglia Orba and from the Col de Marsolino to the Col de Palmarella.

The Fango rises in the commune of Manso to the west of the  Capo Tafonatu.
Its tributaries drain the ridge line in the Monte Cinto massif of which the highest point is the  Punta Minuta.
In its upper reaches it is called the Ruisseau de Capu di Vetto.
It runs in a northwest direction past Monte-Estreino, Barghana, Manso and Tuarelli to enter the Gulf of Caléria just north of the town of Galéria.
From Barghiana to the coast the D351 road follows the river.

Valley

The mouth of the river is biologically very rich, with many birds, amphibians and reptiles.
The lower valley holds very old oak forests dominated by holm oak (´´Quercus ilex).
The upper valley is steep and rocky, with evergreen forest and maquis shrubland.
Fauna include Corsican mouflon, bearded vulture and golden eagle.
There is a small human population in the valley, numbering 435 in 1990, mainly engaged in animal husbandry and tourism.
The Fango Valley was designated a biosphere reserve in 1977, extended and renamed in 1990.
In 2020 the reserve was renamed the Falasorma-Dui Sevi Biosphere Reserve.
Falasorma is the Corsican language name for the Fango valley, and Dui-Sevi is the region included in the reserve's transition zone.

Hydrology

Measurements of the river flow were taken at the Galéria station from 1976 to 2021.

Tributaries
The following streams (ruisseaux'') are tributaries of the Fango (ordered by length) and sub-tributaries:

 Marsolinu 
 Prezzuna 
 Culombu 
 Rimboli 
 Melone 
 Fuglietu 
 Polgge 
 Scala 
 Trea 
 Cannosa 
 Piaggiola 
 Finocchie 
 Ficaccia 
 Querciu 
 Candela 
 Bocca Bianca 
Taïta 
 Muntunaghiu 
 Sposata 
 Terribule 
 Valle Nera 
 Saltare 
 Laoscella 
 Valle Serrata 
 Perticatu 
 Anghione 
 Canne 
 Tetti 
 Parma 
 Rocce 
 Cutalellu 
 Buliga 
 Bussiccia 
 Margine 
 Capronale 
 Campottoli Rossi 
 Capu Rossu 
 Acqua Salsa 
 Valle Sarratra 
 Forchettaghiu

Notes

Sources

Further reading

Rivers of Haute-Corse
Rivers of France
Coastal basins of the Mediterranean Sea in Corsica